The Via Rasella attack was an action taken by the Italian resistance movement against the Nazi German occupation forces in Rome, Italy, on 23 March 1944.

Location 

Via Rasella is located in the centre of the city of Rome, in the rione of  Trevi; it connects Via delle Quattro Fontane (next to the Palazzo Barberini) with Via del Traforo, and took its name from the property of the Raselli family which was located there.

History 

The attack was led by the Gruppi di Azione Patriottica (GAP) against the 11th company of the 3rd battalion of the Polizeiregiment "Bozen" (Police Regiment "Bozen" from Bolzano), a military unit of the German Ordnungspolizei ("Order Police") recruited in the largely ethnic-German Alto Adige region in north-east Italy, during the de facto German annexation of the region (OZAV). At the time of the attack, the regiment was at the disposal of the German military command of the city of Rome, headed by Luftwaffe General Kurt Mälzer.

The attack was performed while the Allies were fighting the third Battle of Monte Cassino, 118 kilometers (73 miles) away from via Rasella, to gain a breakthrough to Rome.

Regarding the Rasella attack, Kesselring stated:

Rome was in the end liberated on 5 June 1944.

The attack 

The attack on 23 March 1944 was the largest Italian partisan attack against the German troops. The GAP members, under the orders of Carlo Salinari (Spartacus) and Franco Calamandrei (Cola), were on Via Rasella during the passage of a company of the Police Regiment "Bozen", consisting of 156 men.

The action began with the explosion of a bomb deposited by Rosario Bentivegna. Eleven other partisans participated:
 Via del Boccaccio: Franco Calamandrei, placed at the corner of the street, Carlo Salira near the tunnel and Silvio Serra;
 Via Rasella: Carla Capponi, Raul Falcioni, Fernando Vitagliano, Pasquale Balsamo, Francesco Curreli, Guglielmo Blasi, Mario Fiorentini and Marisa Musu who provided cover fire by using a mortar.

The other members of the group were absent for various reasons: Lucia Ottobrini was ill, and Maria Teresa Regard was opposed to the choice of the place of the attack.

The attack saw the annihilation of the 11th company and caused the death of 32 men and about 110 wounded as well as two civilians, while the partisans did not have any losses.

German retaliation

Ardeatine Caves 
In retaliation, the German troops killed 335 persons, prisoners and people rounded up, almost all of them civilians in the Ardeatine massacre, organized and conducted by SS Obersturmbannführer (Lieutenant colonel) Herbert Kappler, head of Sicherheitspolizei ("Security Police") and Sicherheitsdienst ("Security Service") in Rome.

References

Bibliography 
 
 

Events in Rome
History of Rome
Italian resistance movement
1944 in Italy
March 1944 events